Teratocoris is a genus of plant bugs in the family Miridae. Species are recorded from the Palaearctic and Nearctic realms.

Species
BioLib includes:
 Teratocoris antennatus (Boheman, 1852)- type species (as Capsus antennatus Boheman, 1852)
 Teratocoris borealis Kelton, 1966
 Teratocoris caricis Kirkaldy, 1909
 Teratocoris depressus Kerzhner, 1979
 Teratocoris discolor Uhler, 1887
 Teratocoris herbaticus Schmidt
 Teratocoris paludum Sahlberg, 1870
 Teratocoris saundersi Douglas & Scott, 1869
 Teratocoris tagoi Yasunaga & Schwartz, 2005
 Teratocoris ussuriensis Kerzhner, 1988
 Teratocoris viridis Douglas & Scott, 1867

References

Further reading

 
 
 

Miridae genera
Articles created by Qbugbot
Stenodemini